Prof. Dr. Ulf-Dietrich Reips is a full professor in the Faculty of Sciences at the University of Konstanz, where he holds the Chair for Psychological Methods, Assessment, and iScience. Between 2009 and 2013 he was a full-time tenured IKERBASQUE research professor at University of Deusto in Bilbao, Spain, and remains affiliated with Ikerbasque. Until 2009 he was an assistant professor and lecturer ('Oberassistent') at the Psychology Department of the University of Zurich, Switzerland. He received his PhD in 1997 and his habilitation (venia legendi, title 'Privatdozent') in 2004 from the University of Tübingen, Germany. In 1992, he received an M.A. in Psychology from Sonoma State University, California. Reips spent most of his undergraduate and graduate years at the University of Tübingen, where he had attended the Leibniz Kolleg. He majored in both Psychology and General Rhetoric (as a student of Walter Jens) and had a minor in Political Science. In 2012, Ulf-Dietrich Reips received a FIRST award from University of Colorado Boulder and is since affiliated on an honorable basis with its Department of Psychology and Neuroscience. Based on his publications' impact and his affiliation with IKERBASQUE, the Consejo Superior de Investigaciones Cientificas, Spain, ranked him 7th of "Top Scientists working at Spanish Private Universities" in 2014. In Fall 2015, Reips was offered to direct the Leibniz Institute for Psychology Information in Trier, in association with a full professorship for Psychology at University of Trier.

Ulf-Dietrich Reips is working on Internet-based research methodologies (or iScience, Internet science, online research methods), in particular Internet-based psychological experimenting (a method used in experimental psychology) and Internet-based tests, the psychology of the Internet, measurement, the cognition of causality, Social Media, and Big Data. In 1994 and 1995 he founded the Web Experimental Psychology Lab, the first laboratory for conducting real experiments on the World Wide Web.  In 1997, he was one of the seven founders of the German Society for Online Research (DGOF) and wrote a book chapter on the methodology of conducting experiments via the Internet  that later won him a young scientist award by the German Society for Psychology. His 2002 article in the journal "Experimental Psychology", Standards for Internet-based experimenting, defined the field and became its journal's most cited article. In 2005, Reips was elected the first non-North American president of the Society for Computers in Psychology (SCiP).

Ulf-Dietrich Reips is the founding editor of the International Journal of Internet Science, currently serving (jointly with Uwe Matzat).

Awards
Ulf-Dietrich Reips and his Web services have received numerous awards, from institutions including the Methods Division of the German Psychological Society (young scientist award, 1997), Oxford University ("key player in the social shaping of e-science and e-social science"), University of Colorado Boulder, Ben Gurion University of the Negev, Encyclopædia Britannica, Der Spiegel, “Planet Science”, Bild der Wissenschaft, New Scientist, The British Academy, Die Zeit, IBM, the American Psychological Society, and others. In January 2017 the Society for Computers in Psychology named the 2001 paper "Reips, U.-D. (2001). The Web Experimental Psychology Lab: Five years of data collection on the Internet. Behavior Research Methods, Instruments, & Computers, 33, 201-211." one of eight "groundbreaking and influential" articles in the history of the society and the field.

In 1996 Ulf-Dietrich Reips won in the First Internet Literature competition in Germany, co-organized by the German weekly Die Zeit and IBM with his digital poem "Das Websonett", a digital media variation and sonetto di risposta on A.W. Schlegel's "Das Sonett". Literature theorist Erika Greber described the Websonett as "literarisch anspruchsvoll" (literarily sophisticated) and featured a special printable version Reips created on the last page of her compendium on poetological metaphorism and literature theory. Reips later created a technically updated version, even though all versions remain fully functional in modern web browsers.

Publications
 Dimensions of Internet Science (2001)
 Standards for Internet-based experimenting (2002)
 Oxford Handbook of Internet Psychology (2007)
 How Internet-mediated research changes science. (2008)
 Advice in surveying the general public over the Internet (2010, with Don A. Dillman and Uwe Matzat)
 Complete list of publications

Web applications
Ulf-Dietrich Reips and his team develop and provide free Web tools for researchers and students.
 Social Lab, an open source social network
 WEXTOR, the Web experiment generator
 iScience Maps, a tool to data mine Twitter
 VAS Generator, creates visual analogue scales as a response format in questionnaires
 Web Experiment List, a list for researchers to post their Internet-based experiments and recruit participants
 Big Five, a personality test validated for use on the Internet
 Questionnaire Checker, a tool to get feedback on questionnaires one creates

References

External links
 Reips page at Google Scholar Citations
 Reips page at Interaction-design.org
 Reips page at ResearchGate
 Reips page at Academia.edu
 Reips homepage
 Affiliate University of Colorado Boulder
 Reips Internet Science portal
 iScience group at Universität Konstanz
 iScience group at Universidad de Deusto
 

Swiss psychologists
Academic staff of the University of Deusto
Academic staff of the University of Konstanz
Living people
Year of birth missing (living people)